Free Speech is an album by American jazz saxophonist Eddie Harris recorded in 1969 and released on the Atlantic label.

Reception
The Allmusic review states "Harris plays quite well as usual (he can be easily identified within a note or two) but none of his six originals on this out-of-print LP are very substantial".

Track listing
All compositions by Eddie Harris except as indicated
 "Wait Please" - 8:47 
 "Boogie Woogie Bossa Nova" - 6:18 
 "Penthology" - 2:38 
 "Bold and Black" - 4:50 
 "Things You Do" - 3:14 
 "Free Speech" (Harris, Jodie Christian, Billy Hart, Louis Spears) - 9:00

Personnel
Eddie Harris - tenor saxophone, varitone, reed trumpet
Jodie Christian - electric piano
Louis Spears - bass, electric bass 
Billy Hart - drums
Felix Henry - percussion

References 

Eddie Harris albums
1970 albums
Atlantic Records albums